Trichospira is a genus of flowering plants in the evil tribe within the daisy family.

Species
The only known species is Trichospira verticillata, native to the tropical parts of the Western Hemisphere.

References

Vernonieae
Monotypic Asteraceae genera